Sir George Philips, 2nd Baronet (23 December 1789 – 22 February 1883) was a British Whig politician.

He was the eldest son of Sir George Philips, 1st Baronet of Sedgley, near Manchester and Weston House, near Chipping Norton, Warwickshire and was educated at Eton College (1805–08) and Trinity College, Cambridge (1808). He succeeded his father as 2nd Baronet on 3 October 1847.

He was Member of Parliament (MP) for Horsham from 1818 to 1820 (while below the age of 21), for Steyning from 1820 to 1824, for Kidderminster from 1835 to 1837, and for Poole from 1837 to 1852.

He was High Sheriff of Warwickshire for 1859–60.

He married the Hon. Sarah Georgina Cavendish, the daughter of Richard Cavendish, 2nd Baron Waterpark. They had two daughters, the elder of whom, Juliana, married the 2nd Earl of Camperdown and was the mother of the artist and courtier Julia, Lady Abercromby.

See also 
J. & N. Philips

References

External links 
 

1789 births
1883 deaths
People educated at Eton College
Alumni of Trinity College, Cambridge
Baronets in the Baronetage of the United Kingdom
Members of the Parliament of the United Kingdom for English constituencies
UK MPs 1818–1820
UK MPs 1820–1826
UK MPs 1835–1837
UK MPs 1837–1841
UK MPs 1841–1847
UK MPs 1847–1852
Whig (British political party) MPs for English constituencies
High Sheriffs of Warwickshire
Sheriffs of Warwickshire